Cola Turka is a cola brand from Turkish company Ülker that is also sold in Germany, Austria, the Netherlands, Belgium, France, Bosnia and Herzegovina, Cuba and Denmark.

The two television commercials (which are presented more like short-subject comic films) feature American actor Chevy Chase playing a confused American who notices his friend, wearing a stereotypically American cowboy hat, using some peculiar words from Turkish culture while drinking a can of Cola Turka. Upon Chase's character drinking Cola Turka in the second commercial, he spontaneously displays Turkish traits like saying Turkish idioms, singing a Turkish folk song, and in the final part of the second commercial, unexpectedly sporting a mustache. The commercials were filmed on location in New York, and are in English with Turkish subtitles.

Cola Turka is sold in 200ml glass bottles, 330ml cans and 500ml, 1 litre, 2 litre, 2.5 and 3 litre PET bottles.

Cola Turka has 3 variants:
 Cola Turka
 Cola Turka Light
 Cola Turka Cappuccino (designed in 2007 by Manhal)

References

External links
 
First movie
Second movie
Iraq war movie

Cola brands
Turkish brands
Products introduced in 2003